This is a list of people associated with ETH Zurich in Switzerland.

Nobel Prize winners

The names listed below are taken from the official record compiled by ETH Zurich. It includes only graduates of ETH Zurich and professors who have been awarded the Nobel Prize for their achievements at ETH Zurich.

Nobel Prize in Physics
 1901 Wilhelm Conrad Röntgen (graduate)
 1920 Charles-Edouard Guillaume (graduate)
 1921 Albert Einstein (student and professor)
 1943 Otto Stern (lecturer)
 1945 Wolfgang Pauli (professor)
 1952 Felix Bloch (graduate)
 1986 Heinrich Rohrer (graduate)
 1987 Georg Bednorz (graduate)
 1987 Karl Alexander Müller (graduate)

Nobel Prize in Chemistry
 1913 Alfred Werner (graduate)
 1915 Richard Martin Willstätter (professor)
 1918 Fritz Haber (attended for one semester)
 1936 Peter Debye (professor)
 1938 Richard Kuhn (professor)
 1939 Leopold Ružička (professor)
 1953 Hermann Staudinger (lecturer)
 1975 Vladimir Prelog (professor)
 1991 Richard Ernst (graduate and professor)
 2002 Kurt Wüthrich (professor)
 2010 Richard F. Heck (postdoctoral scientist)

Nobel Prize in Medicine
 1950 Tadeus Reichstein (graduate)
 1978 Werner Arber (graduate)

Other Nobel laureates directly affiliated with ETH Zurich
 1912 Nils Gustaf Dalén (in collaboration with Aurel Stodola)
 1943 George de Hevesy
 1945 Artturi Ilmari Virtanen (in collaboration with Georg Wiegner)
 1954 Max Born (in collaboration with Adolf Hurwitz)
 1964 Konrad E. Bloch (in collaboration with Leopold Ružička and Vladimir Prelog)
 1968 Lars Onsager (in collaboration with Peter Debye and Erich Hückel)
 1968 Har Gobind Khorana (in collaboration with Vladimir Prelog)
 1969 Max Delbrück (in collaboration with Wolfgang Pauli)
 1987 Jean-Marie Lehn

Other affiliates

Architects

Engineers

Mathematicians

Other fields

Leadership

Rector
 Günther Dissertori March 2022
 Sarah Springman January 2015 - February 2022
 Lino Guzzella 2013 – December 2014
 Heidi Wunderli-Allenspach September 2007 - August 2013
 Konrad Osterwalder 1995 - September 2007
 Walter Traupel 1961 - 1965 
 Albin Herzog 1895-1899

President
 Joël Mesot January 2019
 Lino Guzzella January 2015 - December 2018
 Ralph Eichler September 2007 – December 2014
 Konrad Osterwalder President Pro Tempore November 2006 – September 2007
 Ernst Hafen December 2005 – November 2006

See also
 ETH Zurich
 :Category:ETH Zurich alumni
 :Category:ETH Zurich faculty
 List of people from Zürich

References 

ETH Zurich
ETH Zurich